Not of this World may refer to:

 Not of this World (album), an album released by Christian rock band Petra
 Not of this World (film), an Italian film released in 1999
 Not of this World (apparel), a Christian-based apparel company
 "Not of this World", a song by the American heavy metal band Danzig, from the self-titled album Danzig
 Not Of This World (Pendragon album)

See also 
 NOTW (disambiguation)